Daniel Arce Ibañez (born 22 April 1992, in Burgos) is a Spanish a runner competing primarily in the 3000 metres steeplechase. He finished sixth at the 2018 European Championships. Additionally, he won a silver medal at the 2018 Ibero-American Championships.

Personal bests

Outdoor
800 metres – 1:51.92 (León 2015)
1500 metres – 3:42.46 (Bilbao 2017)
3000 metres – 7:58.72 (Barcelona 2018)
10,000 metres – 30:08.30 (Jaén 2023)
3000 metres steeplechase – 8:14.31 (Rome 2022)
10 kilometres - 	29:49 (Madrid 2020)

International competitions

References

External links
 
 
 
 

1992 births
Living people
Spanish male steeplechase runners
Sportspeople from Burgos
Athletes (track and field) at the 2018 Mediterranean Games
Mediterranean Games competitors for Spain
Athletes (track and field) at the 2020 Summer Olympics
Olympic athletes of Spain
21st-century Spanish people